Lukas Kruse (born 9 July 1983) is a German former professional footballer who played as a goalkeeper.

Career
Kruse signed with FC Augsburg in February 2009 after it was revealed that an injury to second choice goalkeeper Vasily Khomutovsky was to rule him out for the remainder of the season. On 20 April 2010, he announced his return to SC Paderborn 07, leaving FC Augsburg after one year.

In 2017, he transferred to 2. Bundesliga club Holstein Kiel after seven years with SC Paderborn 07.

References

External links
 

Living people
1983 births
Sportspeople from Paderborn
German footballers
Footballers from North Rhine-Westphalia
Association football goalkeepers
Bundesliga players
2. Bundesliga players
3. Liga players
SC Paderborn 07 players
Borussia Dortmund players
Borussia Dortmund II players
FC Augsburg players
Holstein Kiel players